Georgi Robertovich Sakhvadze (born 20 August 1985) is a Russian professional football coach and a former player. He is an assistant coach with FC Krasnodar.

Club career
He played 4 seasons in the Russian Football National League for FC Mashuk-KMV Pyatigorsk and FC Dynamo Saint Petersburg.

External links
 
 

1985 births
Living people
Russian footballers
Association football defenders
FC Spartak-UGP Anapa players
FC Dynamo Saint Petersburg players
FC Sheksna Cherepovets players
FC Spartak Kostroma players
FC Mashuk-KMV Pyatigorsk players